The Domus Conversorum ('House of the Converts'), later Chapel of the Master of the Rolls, was a building and institution in London for Jews who had converted to Christianity.  It provided a communal home and low wages. It was needed because, until 1280, all Jews who converted to Christianity forfeited their possessions to the Crown.
It was established in 1232 by Henry III. With the expulsion of the Jews by Edward I in 1290, it became the only official way for Jews to remain in the country. At that stage there were about eighty residents. By 1356, the last one of these died. Between 1331 and 1608, 48 converts were admitted.  The warden was the Master of the Rolls.

The building was in Chancery Lane.  No records exist after 1609, but, in 1891, the post of chaplain was abolished by Act of Parliament and the location, by then known as the  Rolls Chapel which had been used to store legal archives, became the Public Record Office. The site is today home to the Maughan Library of King's College London.

"Domus Conversorum" was sometimes used also to describe the living quarters of lay brothers in monasteries.

See also 
Crypto-Judaism

References

External links 
 Jewish Encyclopedia
 Converts in Medieval EnglandCity of London Archaeological Society October 2002
 Hospitals: Domus conversorum, A History of the County of London: Volume 1: London within the Bars, Westminster and Southwark (1909), pp. 551-554

 History of the "Domus Conversorum" from 1290 to 1891 [1899] by Michael Adler, at Internet Archive
 DOMUS CONVERSORUM by Cecil Roth. Encyclopaedia Judaica article at encyclopedia.com

1253 establishments in England
Antisemitism in the United Kingdom
Conversion of Jews to Christianity
Former buildings and structures in the London Borough of Camden
Jewish English history
Henry III of England